Crematogaster bogojawlenskii is a species of ant in tribe Crematogastrini. It was described by Ruzsky in 1905.

References

bogojawlenskii
Insects described in 1905